Sierra Lynn Katow is an American stand-up comedian, actress, writer and podcaster.

Early life
Sierra Lynn Katow was born to Vincent and Corinne Katow at the Huntington Memorial Hospital in Pasadena, California and is a fourth-generation American of Chinese and Japanese heritage. She grew up in La Cañada in Los Angeles County. Katow attended La Cañada Elementary School, La Cañada High School, and Harvard University, where she was part of a number of comedy groups including the Harvard College Stand-Up Comic Society and vice-president of The Harvard Lampoon; and from 2013–2014 a cartoonist for The Harvard Crimson, and graduated with a degree in Computer Science in 2016. While attending college, Katow performed in and around Boston and around Hollywood when home on summer break, and participated in a Lampoon roast of and award ceremony for Jimmy Fallon in 2015.

Career
Katow began performing at comedy clubs at the age of 16, and broke into the West Coast stand-up industry during high school. During college she often performed at open mics at comedy clubs in the Boston area, and through this organised further gigs with fellow comedians while backstage.

She was the youngest comedian to feature on Season 9 of Last Comic Standing (2015), which she auditioned for during her junior year, and has also performed stand-up on television in Last Call with Carson Daly, Just For Laughs Digital, Laughs (on Fox) and Acting Out (MTV). 

In 2020, Variety announced Katow was joining the cast of the Chris Blake quarantine comedy, Distancing Socially. The film was shot at the height of the Covid-19 pandemic in 2020, using remote technologies and the iPhone 11. The film was acquired and released by Cinedigm in October 2021.  

In 2021, Katow voiced two characters in Disney's Raya and the Last Dragon and appeared as recurring character Evangeline in Mindy Kaling's The Sex Lives of College Girls on HBO Max. Katow will create a short adult animated series to feature on Cake on FXX in 2022.

Katow has written for Take My Wife; Drop the Mic; Earth to Ned and Close Enough on HBO Max; The Wedding Coach on Netflix; and Eureka! on Disney Junior. She has also been involved in several projects with Wong Fu Productions, including appearing in and writing for the series Dating After College. She also appeared as Mulan in the Screen Junkies web production The Roast of Beauty and the Beast in 2017.

She co-hosted the comedy podcast SCUSSION with SCLARQ + SKATOW with fellow comedian and Harvard alumnus Sam Clark in 2016. Katow is the host of the podcast Stay Podsitive with Sierra Katow, which she started in 2019.

Outside of comedy, Katow does freelance work as a full-stack web developer.

Filmography

Film

Television

Web

References

Living people
American writers of Japanese descent
American writers of Chinese descent
People from Pasadena, California
Writers from Los Angeles
Harvard College alumni
The Harvard Lampoon alumni
The Harvard Crimson people
American podcasters
American women podcasters
American actresses of Japanese descent
American film actors of Asian descent
American comedians of Asian descent
21st-century American actresses
21st-century American comedians
Comedians from California
American actresses of Chinese descent
American film actresses
American stand-up comedians
American television actresses
American television writers
American women comedians
Year of birth missing (living people)